Ma Zhanshan, a general in the Chinese Army who had surrendered in January 1932 and joined the Manchukuo regime, rebelled again in late April, forming his own volunteer army in Heilongjiang province at the beginning of May, and then he established another 11 troops of volunteers at Buxi, Gannan, Keshan, Kedong and other places and thus established the Northeast Anti-Japanese National Salvation Army with Ma appointed as Commander-in-chief, with the other volunteer armies as subordinates at least in name.

See also  
 Japanese invasion of Manchuria
 Second Sino-Japanese War

Sources  
Coogan, Anthony, The volunteer armies of Northeast China, History Today; July 1993, Vol. 43 Issue 7, pp.36-41
Notes On A Guerrilla Campaign, from http://www.democraticunderground.com accessed November 4, 2006

Anti-Japanese Volunteer Armies

Military units and formations established in 1932
Disbanded armies